Prince Narula (born 24 November 1990) is an Indian model and actor. Predominantly known for his performance in reality shows, he has also acted in fiction serials.
Narula has won the reality TV shows MTV Roadies 12 (2015), MTV Splitsvilla 8 (2015), Bigg Boss 9 (2015–2016) and Nach Baliye 9 (2019). He also appeared as the wrestler Lakhan "Lucky" Singh Ahlawat in Badho Bahu (2016–2018) and as Shahnawaz "Shaan" Ali in Naagin 3 (2018).

Personal life

Narula was born on 24 November 1990. He hails from Chandigarh, India. He met Yuvika Chaudhary when he participated in Bigg Boss 9. They got married on 12 October 2018 in Mumbai.

Career

Narula started off in 2014 by participating in PTC Punjabi's Mr. Punjab where he finished as the second runner up. In 2015, he participated in MTV India's Roadies X2 where he emerged as the winner. Next, he participated in Splitsvilla 8 where he was declared the winner. In October 2015, Narula participated in Colors TV's Bigg Boss 9 and emerged as the winner again, thus marking a hat-trick of back-to-back wins.

From 2016 to 2018, he portrayed Lakhan "Lucky" Singh Ahlawat in &TV's Badho Bahu. Since 2016, Narula has also been a Gang Leader in MTV Roadies.

In 2018, he played Aryan in Laal Ishq opposite Yuvika Chaudhary. Next, he portrayed Shahnawaz in Colors TV's Naagin 3.

In 2019, Narula made his digital debut with ZEE5's Bombers as Bali. Next, he participated in Star Plus's Nach Baliye 9 with Yuvika Chaudhary, finishing as the winner thus winning four consecutive reality shows.

Filmography

Television

Special appearances

Web series

Music videos

Singles

Features

References

External links
 
  
 

1990 births
Living people
Male actors from Chandigarh
Indian male models
MTV Roadies contestants
Bigg Boss (Hindi TV series) contestants
Big Brother (franchise) winners
Models from Chandigarh
Fear Factor: Khatron Ke Khiladi participants